Germoir railway station or Mouterij railway station is a railway station in Ixelles, Brussels, Belgium. The station opened on 14 December 2015 on the Line 161.  The train services are operated by the National Railway Company of Belgium (NMBS/SNCB).

The station was built as part of the Brussels Regional Express Network (RER/GEN) and was originally planned to open in 2012.

Train services
The station is served by the following services:

Brussels RER services (S5) Enghien - Halle - Etterbeek - Mechelen (weekdays)
Brussels RER services (S9) Leuven - Brussels-Schuman - Braine-l'Alleud (weekdays)
Brussels RER services (S5) Halle - Etterbeek - Mechelen (weekends)

Tram services
81 Marius Renard - Saint-Guidon - Midi/Zuid Station - Horta - Flagey - Mouterij - Merode - Montgomery

References

Railway stations opened in 2015
Railway stations in Belgium
Railway stations in Brussels